Zulfiqar  is a 2016 Indian crime drama film directed by Srijit Mukherji. The film is based on adaptation of two of William Shakespeare’s tragedies: Julius Caesar and Antony and Cleopatra. The shooting of the film started in January 2016. The film was released on 7 October 2016 during Durga Puja to poor reviews but was a blockbuster of 2016 . The songs from the film topped the charts.

Plot
  
Zulfiqar Ahmed is a Godfather figure and the most prominent member of Syndicate - a powerful organization which oversees most of the happenings in the heart of the city. Basheer Khan, a member of Syndicate is a nationalist, a gangster and the best friend of Zulfiqar, who does not support terrorism. Tony Braganza- parambrata is the brain of The Syndicate who oversees the financial things of the organization, and Markaz Ali is the brawn. If need be, Tony can shoot a bullet, but he is a man of the papers. Tony and Markaz have grown up together and they are inseparable. Though Zulfiqar is married to Karishma Ahmed, he continues an extramarital affair with Rani Talapatra, a money-lender, and the owner of the "Blue Nile Bar", who in turns loves Markaz and vice versa. Kashinath Kundu  is the wily and scheming guy of The Syndicate, who has an ambition for power. The Syndicate also have some corrupt government officials as members, like Customs officer Kaushik Sinha, Port Trust officer Tribhuban Gupta, and a policeman, Laltu Das. Zulfiqar is more equal than the others who carries his aura lightly, but even in this group of equals, his opinion on matters of business and policy weigh a bit more. Not everyone likes this including Kashinath Kundu who fuels Basheer's growing individuality and makes him believe that Zulfiqar was the one who gave shelter to Lashkar-e-Taiba terrorists who came to West Bengal some days earlier by showing him some fake photographs and documents.

Basheer, fully convinced about Zulfiqar's involvement in helping the terrorists to hide in West Bengal, reluctantly decides to kill him with the other conspirators on the auspicious occasion of Eid al-Fitr. Karishma has nightmares of some upcoming danger that is yet to take place with Zulfiqar and repeatedly prevents him from going out on Eid al-Fitr. Zulfiqar, to calm down his wife, decides not to get out. But Danish, Syndicate'''s member, escorts him to go out. Tony and Markaz had no idea about the conspiracy and they were prevented from attending the meeting by Tribhuban, who held both of them for some other cause. During the Syndicate meeting, Mithilesh Sikdar urges the members to rid his brother of the exile, given to him due to the latter's hand in killing of innocent people. Though majority of the members gave their nod to the proposal, Zulfiqar denies the proposal and also told that there is no one to oppose him. At this point, Sharafat Qasim  shoots Zulfiqar from behind, with others, including Kashinath, Sinha, Danish, Shishir Tili and Basheer shooting a bullet each to end Zulfiqar's rule once and for all, whereas Laltu Das and Pavel Lateef escape due to the fact that Basheer didn't want to kill any innocent.

After Zulfiqar's death, Tony and Markaz, along with Zulfiqar's nephew Akhtar Ahmed, Laltu Das, Rani, Pavel and Tony's favourite aide Chenno Bablu go into hiding. Basheer calls them, asking to return on the occasion of Zulfiqar's funeral. At the funeral, Basheer delivers an oration defending his actions and for the moment the crowd, which have gathered outside the assassination spot to know the reasons for Zulfiqar's murder, is on the conspirators' side. However, Tony and Markaz, with a subtle and eloquent speech over Zulfiqar's corpse deftly turns public opinion against the assassins by manipulating the emotions of the common people. Tony, even as he states his intentions against it, rouses the mob to avenge Zulfiqar's murder. The conspirators go into hiding, but one by one Markaz, Tony and Laltu finds and kills Tribhuban, Shishir Tili, and Sinha's twin brother (whom they mistake for Sinha). Basheer reveals that his beloved wife Pariza had committed suicide under the stress of his absence after which the conspirators prepare for a gang war against the loyalists. That night, Zulfiqar's ghost appears to Basheer and tell him, he too will know everything when the right time comes and then once more the ghost will appear. Skirmishes and shootouts occur between the loyalists and the conspirators, in which Pavel, Mithilesh and Qasim are killed. Danish is shot during another shootout, and before his last breath he whispers something to Basheer. Kashinath inadvertently reveals his conspiracy against Zulfiqar to Basheer, the faking of the photographs and how he brainwashed Basheer into killing his best friend, after which Basheer informs him what Danish told him in his last moments- Kashinath is the illegitimate brother of Pariza. Now both of them indulges in a hand-to-hand combat, which ends when they kill each other. With his dying breath, Basheer again sees the ghost of Zulfiqar, as promised before.

The remaining part of the story follows the growing ambition of Akhtar, along with Markaz's relationship with Rani Talapatra, and Tony's marriage to Albeena, Akhtar's sister. With the Syndicate no more existing, Akhtar systematically removes every obstacle in his path, manipulating Markaz and Rani into committing suicide, and killing Tony, Chheno Bablu, and Laltu, thus ultimately becoming the new, all-powerful gangster of the area.

Cast

Soundtrack

 Reception 

 Critical response 
The film received mixed to negative reviews from the  critics. The film was rated 2.5/5 by reviewers of The Times of India. The reviewers lambasted the storytelling, acting, costume design etc. commenting-"The result of the Shakespearean 'fusion' is a film that is an overcooked, hyperventilating stream of images and sound stretching for well over two hours". Editors from Indian Express'' also critiqued the Shakespearean adoption rating the film 2/5.

Controversy
The film was subjected to controversy as it showed the leading characters, mostly Muslims, associated with illegal activities. Chairman of the State Minorities Commission Imtiaz Ali Shah reported the incident to the Chief Minister of West Bengal Mamata Banerjee, following which Mukherji had agreed to address the issues. Sources said Banerjee herself ordered some cuts in the film.

Assistant Professor at Aliah University Mohammad Reyaz wrote a critique of stereotyping of Muslims in the film which led to the director Srijit Mukherji responding with a note on Facebook.

Awards and nominations

References

Further reading

External links
 

Films set in West Bengal
Bengali-language Indian films
2010s Bengali-language films
2016 films
Films scored by Anupam Roy
Indian gangster films
Films set in Kolkata
Films based on Julius Caesar (play)
Films based on Antony and Cleopatra
Films based on multiple works
Modern adaptations of works by William Shakespeare
Cultural depictions of Cicero
Films directed by Srijit Mukherji